The following is a Mackerras pendulum for the 1996 Victorian state election.

"Very safe" seats require a swing of over 20 per cent to change, "safe" seats require a swing of 10 to 20 per cent to change, "fairly safe" seats require a swing of between 6 and 10 per cent, while "marginal" seats require a swing of less than 6 per cent.

Notes
 In December 1996, the Liberal member for Gippsland West, Alan Brown, resigned. Independent candidate Susan Davies won the resulting by-election on 1 February 1997.
 On 11 November 1997, the Liberal member for Mitcham, Roger Pescott, resigned. Labor candidate Tony Robinson won the resulting by-election on 13 December 1997.
 On 3 July 1998, the Labor member for Northcote, Tony Sheehan, resigned. Labor candidate Mary Delahunty won the resulting state by-election on 15 August 1998.
 The member for Frankston East, Peter McLellan, was elected as a member of the Liberal Party, but resigned on 24 July 1998 and subsequently served out the remainder of his term as an independent.

References

 
 

Pendulums for Victorian state elections